Pedro Luís da Fonseca is an Angolan politician and economist. He is currently Minister of Economy and Planning of Angola.

Biography 
He was born in Luanda and on November 17, 1957. He graduated in Economics at the Higher Institute of Economics, Karl Marx in Bulgaria – now University of National and World Economy (1986).

Other activities
 World Bank, Ex-Officio Alternate Member of the Board of Governors

References

1957 births
Living people
Economy ministers of Angola
Planning ministers of Angola
University of National and World Economy alumni
People from Luanda